Patrick Pakenham (Packingham, Pakingham) was an English fellmonger who was burned to death at Uxbridge in August 1555 because he refused to recant his Arian beliefs. He is mentioned in John Foxe's Acts and Monuments in the proceedings of Edmund Bonner against John Denley and another.

References

1555 deaths
Post-Reformation Arian Christians
Arian Christians
Leathermaking
16th-century English people
People executed under Mary I of England
Executed British people
People executed by the Kingdom of England by burning
Year of birth unknown
Protestant martyrs of England